Narathan is 2016 Indian Tamil-language romantic comedy film directed by Naga Venkatesh and produced by - Sajith Venugopalan Nambiar, The Principal India. Nakul, Nikesha Patel, Premji, and Shruti Ramakrishnan star, while Mani Sharma composes the film's music. The film was released on 1 April 2016.

Plot

Vishnu (Nakul) is on his way from Coimbatore to his new job and to see his fiancé who is his uncle's daughter. During his journey he meets Pavitra (Nikesha Patel) and upon his arrival in Chennai, problems begin. Simultaneously Narathan (Premji), a renowned movie director, is living with his uncle, who is also a movie producer. Narathan narrates his story to Vishnu's uncle and surprisingly the same events have been happening in Vishnu's everyone else's lives.

Cast

Production
Narathan produced by Sajith Venugopalan Nambiar was launched  in the presence of the Governor of Tamil Nadu Konijeti Rosaiah in April 2013, with Nakul and Santhanam signed up to play the lead roles. Santhanam's subsequent busy schedule meant that he was later replaced by Premgi Amaren in the role.

The film's cast became a subject of media confusion, when several actresses reportedly claimed that they were set to play the lead role in the film. Nikesha Patel had signed the film and began filming, having committed to her third Tamil film in as many months. She had previously been expected to work with Nakul in K. S. Adhiyaman's Amali Thumali, but had opted out. Bangalore model Deeptii Mohan revealed she was signed on as one of the two heroines, thus marking her debut in Tamil films with the venture. Then Harshika Poonacha reported that she was to play the lead role in the film, noting that she was to feature in songs and scenes opposite Nakul, and suggested that Nikesha could be the film's second lead female actress. Furthermore, Shruthi Ramakrishnan revealed she signed the film to play Nakul's girlfriend, while another actor Shravanth Rao also claimed he was to play Nikesha Patel's pair in the film. The director, Naga Venkatesh, came forward to clarify that Nikesha Patel was the heroine of the film, while Sonu would play a second leading female role. He further noted that Deeptii Mohan would play a pivotal supporting character, contrary to her reports that she would play heroine and that Sharvanth Rao was signed for a different film.

Soundtrack
Soundtrack was composed by Mani Sharma.

Critical reception
Times of India wrote "The premise isn't without potential, but it needs a script that is water-tight and a director who knows how to execute it. Sadly, Naga Venkatesh's script is childish, and his direction haphazard that we start fidgeting barely moments into the film."

References

External links
 

2015 films
2010s Tamil-language films
Indian action films
Films scored by Mani Sharma
2015 action films